Tudur Aled (c. 1465 – 1525) was a late medieval Welsh poet, born in Llansannan, Denbighshire (Sir Ddinbych). He is regarded as a master of cynghanedd.

Beginnings
It is uncertain when Tudur Aled started to write poetry. A remark by him in his elegy to Dafydd ab Edmwnd suggests that Tudur Aled was his pupil. There are firm references to the Battle of Blackheath (1497). An allusion to the Battle of Bosworth Field (1485) has been suspected in his cywydd to Sir William Gruffudd the Chamberlain. A reference in an elegy to him by Raff ap Robert suggests that he had a wife and a son, who was a priest.

Reputation
Tudur Aled was himself a nobleman and one of the foremost Beirdd yr Uchelwyr (Poets of the Nobility). His main patrons were the Salisbury family of Dyffryn Clwyd, and Rhys ap Thomas. He was one of the instigators of the Caerwys eisteddfod of 1523.

During his final illness, Tudur Aled took the habit of Order of St. Francis. He died in Carmarthen, where he was buried in the Brothers' Court. The event was marked by elegies written by several of his fellow poets. He was known particularly for poems in honour of secular and religious noblemen. His work also reflects the changes at the beginning of the 16th century, which were threatening the future of the bardic system.

Bibliography

Thomas Gwynn Jones (ed.), Gwaith Tudur Aled (Cardiff, 1926). The standard collected edition of Tudur's poetry.

External links
 Tudur Aled at Welsh Wikisource

References

16th-century Welsh poets
16th-century male writers
Welsh-language poets
1460s births
1525 deaths
Year of birth uncertain
People from Llansannan